Bramlett or Bramlette is a surname of European origin.

Bramlett Name Meaning 
English:  This American family name was widespread recorded in England. Spelled with a number of variations The BRAMLETT family dates back to the 1540s in Devonshire, Yorkshire and Durham.

Bramlett American Origins 
A 1690 transport record lists the name Ambrose BAMBLET. He was transported by John Lydell along with 44 others to VA. The record shows John received 2000+ acres in New Kent Co., VA for his efforts.

The first known William Bramlitt/Bramlett in the US was born (est) Before 1694. Under English Common Law he had to be 21 to be a witness to the deed dated 1716 and son Henry Sr was born Abt 1710 lived in Essex & Caroline Co., VA  and moved about 1750–1752 to Lunenburg Co., VA. [part of Lunenburg formed Bedford Co., VA, in 1754.] The 1752 Lunenburg Co. tax list shows William Sr and William Jr Bramlett living in the same household. William Sr probably died soon after giving his stock & household goods to son-in-law Stephen White in November 1759. This action, along with comments regarding his will "bearing date 6th of February 1750" and maintenance "agreeable to my age" shows he was an elderly man in 1759.

Famous Bramlett's 
The name refers to:

James Edwin Bramlett (b. 1932) fine western artist, writer, and was an extra in the Movie Billy Jack 
A. J. Bramblett (b. 1977), American professional basketball player
Bekka Bramlett (b. 1968), American singer; daughter of Delaney and Bonnie Bramlett
David E. Bramlet (1954-2018),American Botanist
Bonnie Bramlett (b. 1944), American pop and rock singer
David A. Bramlett (b. 1941), American army general officer; Commander of U.S. Army Forces Command 1996–98
Delaney Bramlett (1939–2008), American singer, songwriter, and producer
 Elic Bramlett, Actor
John Bramlett (b. 1941), American professional football player
Ron Bramlett (b. 1979), American track and field athlete
Thomas E. Bramlette (1817–1875), American politician; Governor of Kentucky 1863–67

Places named Bramlett

References